Qian Hong (born 9 November 1971) is a Chinese windsurfer. He finished 12th in the men's Mistral One Design event at the 1996 Summer Olympics.

References

External links
 
 
 

1971 births
Living people
Chinese windsurfers
Chinese male sailors (sport)
Olympic sailors of China
Sailors at the 1996 Summer Olympics – Mistral One Design
Asian Games gold medalists for China
Asian Games medalists in sailing
Sailors at the 1994 Asian Games
Medalists at the 1994 Asian Games
Sportspeople from Ningbo
20th-century Chinese people